Saint Kizito Hospital Matany, commonly known as Matany Hospital is a private hospital in Matany Trading Centre, Moroto District, Karamoja sub-region, in the Northern Region of Uganda.

Location

The geographical coordinates of Matany Hospital are:02°26'40.0"N, 34°23'42.0"E (Latitude:2.444444; Longitude:34.395000).

Overview
Matany Hospital is a private, non-profit, community hospital owned by the Roman Catholic Diocese of Moroto and is accredited by the Uganda Catholic Medical Bureau. The hospital is administered by Comboni Sisters, a religious congregation. The hospital has a capacity of 226 beds.

Matany Hospital Maintains an attached Nursing Training School, an airstrip (Matany Airstrip). Due its relatively well-maintained infrastructure, compared to nearby Moroto Regional Referral Hospital, Matany Hospital functions as a referral hospital for the Karamoja sub-region and for the nearby districts of Amuria,  Kapelebyong, Katakwi and Soroti.

History
St. Kizito Hospital, Matany was built in the early 1970s with assistance from MISEREOR, a German religious organization, at the invitation of the Comboni Missionaries. Construction began in 1970 and was completed in 1974. The hospital has received funding from numerous benefactors from various countries, including Germany, Italy and Denmark, among others.

See also
Hospitals in Uganda

References

External links
 Website of Matany Hospital

Hospitals in Uganda
Moroto District
Karamoja
Hospital buildings completed in 1974
1974 establishments in Uganda
Catholic hospitals in Africa